HANTH B.C. is the men's basketball department of the Greek multi-sports club HANTH. It was founded in 1919. The club is based in Thessaloniki, Greece. The club's Greek name is X.A.N.Θ (Χριστιανική Αδελφότητα Νέων Θεσσαλονίκης), which means Young Men's Christian Association of Thessaloniki. Common alternate names of the club include HANTh B.C. and HAN Thessaloniki B.C. The club is also known as being the YMCA Thessaloniki Association's basketball club, or YMCA Thessaloniki B.C.

History

In 1919, organized basketball began to be played by HANTH locally. Then in 1921, the parent athletic club Χ.Α.Ν.Θ. (English: YMCA) was formed, and it included the basketball section. HAN Thessaloniki was one of the founding members of the first Thessaloniki regional basketball tournament (1925–26), and it finished in second place in that tournament, behind Aris Thessaloniki.

HAN won the Greek 2nd Division championship in the 1968–69 season. The club played in Europe's third-tier level league, the FIBA Korać Cup competition, in the 1973 season, the 1973–74 season, and in the 1974–75 season. HAN also won the Greek 2nd Division championship in the 1976–77 season. 

The club won the Greek 4th Division championship in the 1991–92 season. Over the years, HAN Thessaloniki has played in the top-tier level Greek League in a total of 22 seasons.

Arena
In earlier times, HAN Thessaloniki played its home games at the Thessaloniki Forum outdoor stadium. HAN Thessaloniki's current home indoor arena, is the Y.M.C.A. New Sports Center, which has a seating capacity of 1,500.

Titles and honors
National:
Greek 2nd Division: (2×) Champion: 
(1969, 1977)
Greek 4th Division: Champion: 
(1992)

Regional:
 Thessaloniki Regional Championship: 16× Champion (record):
(1931, 1932, 1933, 1934, 1946, 1947, 1948, 1949, 1950, 1951, 1952, 1953, 1954, 1955, 1956, 1957)

Notable players

  Michalis Giannouzakos
  Vassilis Lipiridis
  Sotos Nikolaidis
  Anestis Petalidis
 / Vladimir Petrović-Stergiou
  Christoforos Stefanidis
  Takis Taliadoros
  Georgios Trontzos
  Lakis Tsavas
  Mimis Tsikinas
  Kostas Vlasios
  Nikos Zisis

Retired numbers

Head coaches
  Sotos Nikolaidis: (2016–2018)

Greek basketball museum
The club's headquarters also houses a Greek national basketball museum.

References

External links
Y.M.C.A. Official Site 
Eurobasket.com Team page

HANTH
1919 establishments in Greece
Basketball teams in Greece
Sports clubs founded by the YMCA